Howard Smith (born 29 September 1956) is a British bobsledder. He competed in the four man event at the 1984 Winter Olympics.

References

External links
 

1956 births
Living people
British male bobsledders
Olympic bobsledders of Great Britain
Bobsledders at the 1984 Winter Olympics
Place of birth missing (living people)